The Podvis School (Macedonian: Подвишко училиште, Podviško učilište), also known as Old School Building (Macedonian: Стара училишна зграда, Stara učilišna zgrada), is a building of the first primary school that held classes in contemporary Macedonian language, in the village of Podvis, North Macedonia. The building is declared as a Monument of Culture.

The old building is located in the village of Podvis, high above the last remaining houses in the village.

Location 

The old school in village of Podvis, where in 1943 the classes were taught in contemporary Macedonian language, is located high above the last remaining houses in the village and the main village St. Athanasius Church. The only path to the village is a dirt road, and to the building itself there is only a hiking track and there is no clear sign showing where the school is located.

History 
Prior to the April War in 1941, in the school was taught in Serbian language, according to the Royal Yugoslav educational system and the forced Serbianisation.

Teaching in the Macedonian language, the school began working on September 23, 1943, only six days after the liberation of Kičevo. The first class was held by the teacher Vasilko Risteski Lazaroski.

In the late 50s/early 60s, a new school building was constructed in the lower and newer parts of the village located near the Treska river and this older building lost its function as a school.

On December 15, 1978 the building was listed as Cultural heritage site.

Current state 

Today, the school building is in bad shape, the floor has collapsed, the wall has collapsed, there is no door, and the ceiling is crumbling. The site is overgrown with thorns and bushes, and the only way to get there is with an off-road vehicle.

The commemorative plaque, that was placed inside the building, was removed by the locals and moved to the newer part of village of Podvis, in the lowland area.

Even though the Ministry of Culture made announcements for renovating the building during 2014, that never happened.

Gallery

References

External links 

  - a 2006 video report about the village of Podvis; from 11:39 to 29:17 mentioning about the Podvis School
  - a 2021 video report about the Podvis School by TV Telma

Schools in North Macedonia
Languages of North Macedonia
1943 establishments in Yugoslavia
Historic sites in North Macedonia